William Paul McCartney (born August 22, 1940) is a former American football player and coach and the founder of the Promise Keepers men's ministry. He was the head coach at the University of Colorado Boulder for thirteen seasons (1982–1994), compiled a  record, and won three consecutive Big Eight Conference titles (1989–1991). McCartney's 1990 team was crowned as national champions by the Associated Press, splitting the title with Georgia Tech, first in the final Coaches' Poll.

McCartney was inducted into the College Football Hall of Fame as a coach in 2013.

Early life and career
After receiving his Bachelor of Arts in education from the University of Missouri in 1962, where he was a member of the Pi Kappa Alpha fraternity, McCartney was named as an assistant football coach under his older brother, Tom, in the summer of 1965 at Holy Redeemer High School in Detroit, Michigan. The younger McCartney was also the head basketball coach at Redeemer from 1965 to 1969, taking the school to the Detroit City Championship during the 1968–69 season. McCartney then served as the head football and basketball coach at Divine Child High School in Dearborn before becoming the only high school coach ever hired by University of Michigan head coach Bo Schembechler.

Head coach at Colorado
After eight years as an assistant at Michigan, McCartney was hired to replace Chuck Fairbanks as head coach at the University of Colorado on June 9, 1982. In his first season, the Colorado Buffaloes compiled a record of 2–8–1. After improving to 4–7 in 1983, Colorado sustained a 1–10 campaign in 1984, but McCartney was given a contract extension nonetheless. In his fourth season in 1985, McCartney switched to the wishbone offense in the spring, then  guided the Buffs to a 7–4 regular season and a berth in the Freedom Bowl, where they lost to Washington. In 1986, CU earned its first victory over Big Eight Conference powerhouse Nebraska since 1967. After modestly successful seasons in 1987 and 1988, McCartney steered his team toward national prominence.

After the 1988 season, the Buffaloes' star quarterback Sal Aunese was diagnosed with stomach cancer and died in the middle of the 1989 season. Nonetheless, Colorado won all eleven of its regular season games including victories over ranked Washington, Illinois, Nebraska, and Oklahoma. The top-ranked Buffaloes faced #4 Notre Dame in the Orange Bowl on New Year's, but lost 21–6.

Colorado opened the 1990 season ranked fourth with a game against Tennessee in the inaugural Disney Pigskin Classic in Anaheim, California, which ended in a 31–31 tie. A comeback win over Stanford and a one-point loss to Illinois leveled the Buffaloes' record at 1–1–1. Colorado then won the remainder of their regular season games. Their winning streak, highlighted by wins over ranked Washington, Oklahoma, and Nebraska, was not without controversy. In a game against Missouri on October 6, the officials mistakenly allowed an extra down on which Colorado scored the winning touchdown as time expired. The game, known as the Fifth Down Game, became one of the most notorious officiating gaffes in college football history. Contentions notwithstanding, Colorado rose to #1 in the rankings and again faced Notre Dame in the Orange Bowl. The Buffaloes won a closely played game 10–9, aided by a questionable and debated clipping call that negated a late punt return touchdown by Rocket Ismail of Notre Dame, and earned a share of the national title. Colorado was first in the final AP Poll while Georgia Tech was first in the Coaches' Poll.

The following year, the Buffaloes tied Nebraska for the Big Eight title and lost to Alabama in the Blockbuster Bowl. In 1992, Colorado was 9–1–1 in the regular season, but lost to Syracuse in the Fiesta Bowl. In 1994, McCartney's final year, he coached the Buffaloes to a victory at Michigan, where McCartney had spent eight years as an assistant. Colorado won the game 27–26 on a 64-yard Hail Mary pass from Kordell Stewart to Michael Westbrook as time expired, which has since become known as The Miracle at Michigan. The Buffaloes posted an 11–1 record in 1994, capped by a win over Notre Dame in the Fiesta Bowl. At the end of the 1994 season, McCartney retired from coaching at the age of 54.

McCartney holds records for the most games coached (153), most wins (93), and most conference wins (58) in the history of the Colorado Buffaloes football program.

In 1995, there was widespread media speculation that McCartney might un-retire to serve as the head coach at Michigan following the resignation of Gary Moeller.  McCartney, a former Wolverines assistant coach under Bo Schembechler, held a news conference to remove his name from consideration, stating that he wanted to devote his time to Promise Keepers.

In 2012, McCartney publicly criticized Colorado's firing of head coach Jon Embree as racially motivated.

Beyond coaching
In 1990, while he was head football coach at Colorado, McCartney founded a Christian men's group, Promise Keepers. He later resigned as the head of Promise Keepers and founded another organization, The Road to Jerusalem. In September 2008, McCartney rejoined Promise Keepers as CEO and chairman of the board. He serves on the board of directors of the Equip Foundation, Gospel to the Unreached Millions, and Concerts of Prayer International. McCartney was on the forefront to support Amendment 2 to the Colorado Constitution, which denied the designation of homosexuals as a "protected class." His public appearance in the facilities of CU to support the Amendment caused an outcry among students of CU. The Amendment was found unconstitutional by the Supreme Court.

McCartney is the author of five books: From Ashes to Glory (1995), Sold Out (1997), Sold Out Two-Gether (1999), co-authored with his wife, Lyndi McCartney, Blind Spots: What You Don't See May Be Keeping Your Church From Greatness (2003), and Two Minute Warning: Why It's Time to Honor Jewish People Before the Clock Runs Out (2009) with Aaron Fruh.

Honors
McCartney won a number of national coaching awards in 1989, including the Eddie Robinson Coach of the Year award, the Walter Camp Coach of the Year Award and the Paul "Bear" Bryant Award. Three times, in 1985, 1989, and 1990, he was named the Big Eight Coach of the Year. McCartney was inducted into the Orange Bowl Hall of Fame in 1996 and the Colorado Sports Hall of Fame in 1999.

McCartney has been honored with a number of additional personal awards including: the Impact America Award from Point Loma College in 1995, the Spectrum Award from Sports Spectrum magazine in 1995, ABC News Person of the Week on February 16, 1996, Layperson of the Year from the National Association of Evangelicals in 1996, the Fire-Setters Award from Revival Fires Ministries in 1997, the Evangelist Philip Award from the National Association of United Methodist Evangelists in 1999, and the Humanitarian of the Year from the Syl Morgan Smith Colorado Gospel Music Academy in 1999.

Personal life
McCartney lived with his wife, Lyndi, in the Denver area. They had four children (three sons and one daughter) and ten grandchildren, one of whom (T. C. McCartney, a former LSU quarterback) was fathered by former player Sal Aunese. Another grandson, Derek, was fathered by another former player Shannon Clavelle.

Just before the 1993 Fiesta Bowl, McCartney confessed to his wife that he had committed adultery 20 years ago. Lyndi later suffered from severe bulimia and contemplated suicide, which prompted McCartney to retire from coaching in 1994. Lyndi died of emphysema in 2013.

In 2016, McCartney's family announced he had been diagnosed with dementia and Alzheimer's disease. He lives with his daughter Kristy.

The McCartneys attend Cornerstone Church in Boulder, Colorado.

Head coaching record

References

External links
 
 

1940 births
Living people
People from Riverview, Michigan
Sportspeople from Dearborn, Michigan
Players of American football from Michigan
Missouri Tigers football players
Coaches of American football from Michigan
High school basketball coaches in Michigan
High school football coaches in Michigan
Michigan Wolverines football coaches
Colorado Buffaloes football coaches
College Football Hall of Fame inductees
Writers from Colorado
Writers from Michigan
American evangelicals
American Christian religious leaders
American Christian writers
Promise Keepers